Thembeka Vuyisile Buyisile Mchunu (born 31 January 1968) is a South African politician from KwaZulu-Natal serving as a Member of the National Assembly of South Africa since 2019. A member of the African National Congress, she served as the Executive Mayor of the Uthungulu District Municipality from 2011 to 2016. She is married to Senzo Mchunu, the current Minister of Water and Sanitation and the former premier of KwaZulu-Natal.

Early life and education
Mchunu was born on 31 January 1968, in Ixopo in South Africa's former Natal Province, to Thenjiwe and Joshua. She is the older sister of Thabo Mofokeng, who formerly served as the spokesperson of the eThekwini Metropolitan Municipality. Her parents divorced when she was five. She and Thabo then went to live with her paternal grandmother. She attended Carisbrooke Primary School and later Laduma High School.

When she was in Grade 8, Mchunu relocated to Pietermaritzburg to live with her mother, who was a teacher. She matriculated from St Augustine's in 1985. Mchunu then studied to become a teacher at the Umbumbulu College of Education. She earned a diploma in education and began her teaching career in Zululand in 1990.

Career
Mchunu taught at multiple schools in Zululand between 1990 and 2006, when she was elected as an African National Congress councillor in the  Uthungulu District Municipality. She served as a regional secretary for the African National Congress Women's League. In 2011, she was elected mayor of the district municipality. During her mayoralty, the district received its first clean audit from the Auditor-General for the 2012/2013 financial year. Following her husband Senzo's election as premier and she becoming First Lady of KwaZulu-Natal in 2013, opposition parties called on her to step down as mayor. She rejected their calls, saying in a 2014 interview with the Zululand Observer: "I think opposition parties are just playing politics."

Following mounting pressure from the ANC, Mchunu's husband, Senzo, resigned as premier in May 2016, causing her to lose the title of First Lady. Prior to the local elections in August 2016, the ANC nominated Nonhle Mkhulisi as their mayoral candidate for the district. The district was also renamed to the King Cetshwayo District Municipality. Mchunu had started the process to change the district's name after she was elected as mayor in 2011.

Parliamentary career
Mchunu was elected to the National Assembly in the 2019 general elections from the ANC's KwaZulu-Natal list. She sits on the Portfolio Committee on Environment, Forestry and Fisheries. Her husband currently serves as Minister of Water and Sanitation.

Candidacy for Regional Chairperson 
In January 2022, Mchunu was announced as a candidate for regional chairperson of the ANC's Musa Dladla (King Cetshwayo District) region. Mchunu led a slate that included Tholi Gwala as her deputy with former district mayor Lindo Phungula as regional treasurer. She lost to Musa Cebekhulu at the regional conference in May 2022.

Personal life
Mchunu met Senzo Mchunu when she was 16 years old. They married in July 1990. They had a son but he died. She had four more children with Senzo, two boys and two girls. They also have grandchildren.

References

External links
Profile at Parliament of South Africa

Living people
1968 births
People from KwaZulu-Natal
African National Congress politicians
Members of the National Assembly of South Africa
Mayors of places in South Africa